Music Teacher is a 2019 Indian Hindi-language drama film directed and co-written by Sarthak Dasgupta.

Cast 
 Manav Kaul as Beni Madhav Singh
 Divya Dutta as Geeta
 Neena Gupta as Madhavi
 Amrita Bagchi as Jyotsna Ray aka Joina
 Niharika Lyra Dutt as Urmi
 Jaspal Sharma as barber

Soundtrack 

The film music was composed by Rochak Kohli . Kohli used two classic scores, composed by legendary music composer R.D. Burman . The songs that Kohli recreated were Phir Wohi Raat from the film Ghar and Rimjhim Gire Sawan from the film Manzil . The original scores were sung by Kishore Kumar and one by Kishore Kumar and Lata Mangeshkar .

References

External links 
 
 

2010s Hindi-language films
Indian drama films
Hindi-language Netflix original films
2019 films
Indian direct-to-video films
2019 direct-to-video films
2019 drama films
Hindi-language drama films